The 1988 SEC Men’s Basketball Tournament took place from March 10–13, 1988 at the Pete Maravich Assembly Center in Baton Rouge, Louisiana. Kentucky won the tournament and received the SEC's automatic bid to the NCAA Division I men's basketball tournament, defeating Georgia by a score of 62–57.  Kentucky's championship was later vacated due to NCAA violations.  The Wildcats were also placed on probation.

Jefferson-Pilot Teleproductions (in its second season of producing regionally syndicated SEC basketball games) provided television coverage of the first round, the quarterfinals, and the semifinals. Coverage of the championship game was broadcast on the ABC Television Network through its sports division, ABC Sports.

Bracket

References
 

 

SEC men's basketball tournament
1987–88 Southeastern Conference men's basketball season
Basketball competitions in Louisiana
1988 in sports in Louisiana
Sports in Baton Rouge, Louisiana
College sports tournaments in Louisiana
SEC men's basketball tournament